is a passenger railway station located in the city of Hanyū, Saitama, Japan, operated by the private railway operator Chichibu Railway.

Station layout
This station consists of a single side platform, serving a single bi-directional track.

Lines

Adjacent stations

History
Nishi-Hanyū Station opened on 1 September 1981.

Passenger statistics
In fiscal 2018, the station was used by an average of 323 passengers daily.

Surrounding area
 National Route 122
 Hanyu-jitsugyo High School

See also
 List of railway stations in Japan

References

External links

  

Stations of Chichibu Railway
Railway stations in Japan opened in 1981
Railway stations in Saitama Prefecture
Hanyū, Saitama